This article lists described species of the family Asilidae start with letter S.

A
B
C
D
E
F
G
H
I
J
K
L
M
N
O
P
Q
R
S
T
U
V
W
Y
Z

List of Species

Genus Saropogon
 Saropogon aberrans (Loew, 1857)
 Saropogon albicans (Janssens, 1961)
 Saropogon albifrons (Back, 1904)
 Saropogon alternatus (Loew, 1873)
 Saropogon antipodus (Schiner, 1868)
 Saropogon aretalogus (Séguy, 1953)
 Saropogon atricolor (Loew, 1837)
 Saropogon aurifrons (Macquart, 1850)
 Saropogon axillaris (Loew, 1851)
 Saropogon beckeri (Villeneuve, 1922)
 Saropogon bijani (Abbassian-Lintzen, 1964)
 Saropogon birdi (Curran, 1931)
 Saropogon bryanti (Wilcox, 1966)
 Saropogon castaneicornis (Macquart, 1838)
 Saropogon chathamensis (Hutton, 1901)
 Saropogon clarkii (Hutton, 1901)
 Saropogon coquilletti (Back, 1909)
 Saropogon dasynotus (Loew, 1871)
 Saropogon discus (Walker, 1849)
 Saropogon dispar (Coquillett, 1902)
 Saropogon dissimulans (White, 1918)
 Saropogon distinctus (Becker, 1906)
 Saropogon dubiosus (Theodor, 1980)
 Saropogon ehrenbergii (Loew, 1851)
 Saropogon elbaiensis (Efflatoun, 1937)
 Saropogon eucerus (Loew, 1847)
 Saropogon extenuatus (Hutton, 1901)
 Saropogon flavicinctus (Wiedemann, 1820)
 Saropogon flavofacialis (Hull, 1956)
 Saropogon fletcheri (Bromley, 1934)
 Saropogon fracipes (Hutton, 1901)
 Saropogon frontalis (Loew, 1869)
 Saropogon fucatus (Loew, 1869)
 Saropogon fugiens (Hutton, 1901)
 Saropogon fulvus (Theodor, 1980)
 Saropogon galilaeus (Theodor, 1980)
 Saropogon geniculatus (Loew, 1869)
 Saropogon gigas (Becker, 1913)
 Saropogon greatheadi (Londt, 1997)
 Saropogon hudsoni (Hutton, 1901)
 Saropogon hulli (Joseph & Parui, 1997)
 Saropogon hyalinus (Coquillett, 1904)
 Saropogon hypomelas (Loew, 1866)
 Saropogon incisuratus (Wulp, 1899)
 Saropogon kenyensis (Londt, 1997)
 Saropogon lamperti (Becker, 1906)
 Saropogon laparoides (Bromley, 1951)
 Saropogon leucogenus (Séguy, 1953)
 Saropogon lhoti (Séguy, 1938)
 Saropogon limbinervis (Macquart, 1855)
 Saropogon londti (Parui, 1999)
 Saropogon longicornis (Macquart, 1838)
 Saropogon maculipennis (Brunetti, 1928)
 Saropogon maroccanus (Séguy, 1930)
 Saropogon meghalayensis (Parui, 1999)
 Saropogon megriensis (Richter, 1966)
 Saropogon melanophrus (Bigot, 1878)
 Saropogon mellipes (Bromley, 1934)
 Saropogon mofidii (Abbassian-Lintzen, 1964)
 Saropogon mohawki (Wilcox, 1966)
 Saropogon monachus (Janssens, 1960)
 Saropogon nepalensis (Parui, 1999)
 Saropogon nigritarsus (Hull, 1956)
 Saropogon nitidus (Wilcox, 1966)
 Saropogon notatus (Loew, 1869)
 Saropogon olivierii (Macquart, 1838)
 Saropogon perlatus (Costa, 1884)
 Saropogon philocalus (Séguy, 1941)
 Saropogon pittoproctus (Loew, 1873)
 Saropogon platynotus (Loew, 1847)
 Saropogon pollinosus (Loew, 1869)
 Saropogon pritchardi (Bromley, 1934)
 Saropogon proximus (Hutton, 1901)
 Saropogon pseudojugulum (Theodor, 1980)
 Saropogon pulcherrimus (Williston, 1901)
 Saropogon pulverulentus (Wulp, 1899)
 Saropogon purus (Curran, 1930)
 Saropogon revivensis (Theodor, 1980)
 Saropogon rubiventris (Wulp, 1899)
 Saropogon rubricosus (Bezzi, 1916)
 Saropogon rufipes (Gimmerthal, 1847)
 Saropogon scalaris (Bigot, 1878)
 Saropogon sculleni (Wilcox, 1966)
 Saropogon semirubra (Meijere, 1914)
 Saropogon semiustus (Coquillett, 1904)
 Saropogon solus (Bromley, 1951)
 Saropogon specularis (Bezzi, 1916)
 Saropogon srilankaensis (Joseph & Parui, 1995)
 Saropogon subauratus (Walker, 1854)
 Saropogon tassilaensis (Séguy, 1953)
 Saropogon thailandensis (Tomosovic & Grootaert, 2003)
 Saropogon tiberiadis (Theodor, 1980)
 Saropogon tigris (Parui, 1999)
 Saropogon treibensis (Theodor, 1980)
 Saropogon trispiculum (Tomosovic, 2005)
 Saropogon varians (Bigot, 1888)
 Saropogon velutinus (Carrera & Papavero, 1962)
 Saropogon verticalis (Oldroyd, 1958)
 Saropogon viduus (Walker, 1849)
 Saropogon villosus (Janssens, 1961)
 Saropogon wilcoxi (Papavero, 1971)
 Saropogon zinidi (Londt, 1997)
 Saropogon zopheropterus (Janssens, 1969)

Genus Satanas
 Satanas agha (Engel, 1934)
 Satanas fuscanipennis (Macquart, 1855)
 Satanas gigas (Eversmann, 1855)
 Satanas minor (Portschinsky, 1887)
 Satanas niveus (Macquart, 1838)
 Satanas testaceicornis (Macquart, 1855)

Genus Schildia
 Schildia alphus (Martin, 1975)
 Schildia guatemalae (Martin, 1975)
 Schildia jamaicensis (Farr, 1962)
 Schildia microthorax (Aldrich, 1923)
 Schildia ocellata (Martin, 1975)
 Schildia zonae (Martin, 1975)

Genus Scleropogon
 Scleropogon bradleyi (Bromley, 1937)
 Scleropogon cinerascens (Back, 1909)
 Scleropogon coyote (Bromley, 1931)
 Scleropogon dispar (Bromley, 1937)
 Scleropogon duncani (Bromley, 1937)
 Scleropogon floridensis (Bromley, 1951)
 Scleropogon haigi (Wilcox, 1971)
 Scleropogon helvolus (Loew, 1874)
 Scleropogon huachucanus (Hardy, 1942)
 Scleropogon indistinctus (Bromley, 1937)
 Scleropogon kelloggi (Wilcox, 1937)
 Scleropogon neglectus (Bromley, 1931)
 Scleropogon oaxacensis (Martin, 1968)
 Scleropogon petilus (Martin, 1968)
 Scleropogon similis (Jones, 1907)
 Scleropogon texanus (Bromley, 1931)

Genus Scylaticina
 Scylaticina tucumana (Artigas & Papavero, 1991)

Genus Scylaticodes
 Scylaticodes carrascoi (Artigas, 1974)
 Scylaticodes cuneigaster (Artigas, 1970)

Genus Scylaticus
 Scylaticus albofasciatus (Engel, 1932)
 Scylaticus braunsi (Londt, 1992)
 Scylaticus bromleyi (Londt, 1992)
 Scylaticus bunohippus (Londt, 1992)
 Scylaticus callimus (Londt, 1992)
 Scylaticus camptus (Londt, 1992)
 Scylaticus ceratitus (Londt, 1992)
 Scylaticus chrysotus (Londt, 1992)
 Scylaticus cruciger (Hermann, 1921)
 Scylaticus cuthbertsoni (Londt, 1992)
 Scylaticus danus (Londt, 1992)
 Scylaticus degener (Schiner, 1868)
 Scylaticus elamiensis (Abbassian-Lintzen, 1964)
 Scylaticus engeli (Bromley, 1947)
 Scylaticus entrichus (Londt, 1992)
 Scylaticus godavariensis (Joseph & Parui, 1997)
 Scylaticus gongocerus (Londt, 1992)
 Scylaticus gymnosternum (Londt, 1992)
 Scylaticus hadromedus (Londt, 1992)
 Scylaticus indicus (Bromley, 1939)
 Scylaticus iota (Londt, 1992)
 Scylaticus irwini (Londt, 1992)
 Scylaticus laevinus (Walker, 1849)
 Scylaticus loewi (Londt, 1992)
 Scylaticus lutescens (Hermann, 1914)
 Scylaticus marginatus (Engel, 1932)
 Scylaticus melanus (Londt, 1992)
 Scylaticus midas (Londt, 1992)
 Scylaticus miniatus (Becker, 1915)
 Scylaticus namibiensis (Londt, 1992)
 Scylaticus palestinensis (Theodor, 1980)
 Scylaticus pardalotus (Londt, 1992)
 Scylaticus phaeus (Londt, 1992)
 Scylaticus quadrifasciatus (Engel & Cuthbertson, 1934)
 Scylaticus ricardoae (Londt, 1992)
 Scylaticus ruficauda (Bigot, 1878)
 Scylaticus sayano (Nagatomi, 1983)
 Scylaticus semizonatus (Becker, 1906)
 Scylaticus suranganiensis (Parui & Kaur & Kapoor, 1994)
 Scylaticus thecarus (Londt, 1992)
 Scylaticus triginus (Londt, 1992)
 Scylaticus trophus (Londt, 1992)
 Scylaticus tyligmus (Londt, 1992)
 Scylaticus whiteheadi (Londt, 1992)
 Scylaticus zirconius (Londt, 1992)

Genus Scytomedes
 Scytomedes palaestinus (Theodor, 1980)

Genus Senobasis
 Senobasis almeidai (Carrera, 1946)
 Senobasis bromleyana (Carrera, 1949)
 Senobasis clavigeroides (Papavero, 1975)
 Senobasis corsair (Bromley, 1951)
 Senobasis flukei (Carrera, 1952)
 Senobasis frosti (Bromley, 1951)
 Senobasis lenkoi (Papavero, 1975)
 Senobasis mendax (Curran, 1934)

Genus Senoprosopis
 Senoprosopis diardii (Macquart, 1838)

Genus Sinopsilonyx
 Sinopsilonyx tibialis (Hsia, 1949)

Genus Sintoria
 Sintoria cazieri (Wilcox, 1972)
 Sintoria cyanea (Wilcox, 1972)
 Sintoria emeralda (Hull, 1962)
 Sintoria lagunae (Wilcox, 1972)
 Sintoria mojavae (Wilcox, 1972)
 Sintoria pappi (Wilcox, 1972)
 Sintoria rossi (Wilcox, 1972)

Genus Sisyrnodytes
 Sisyrnodytes apicalis (Oldroyd, 1957)
 Sisyrnodytes aterrimus (Engel, 1929)
 Sisyrnodytes brevis (Macquart, 1838)
 Sisyrnodytes curtus (Wiedemann, 1819)
 Sisyrnodytes defusus (Oldroyd, 1974)
 Sisyrnodytes diplocus (Oldroyd, 1974)
 Sisyrnodytes engeddensis (Theodor, 1980)
 Sisyrnodytes erebus (Oldroyd, 1957)
 Sisyrnodytes irwini (Oldroyd, 1974)
 Sisyrnodytes luscinius (Walker, 1849)
 Sisyrnodytes niveipilosus (Ricardo, 1925)
 Sisyrnodytes sericeus (Oldroyd, 1974)
 Sisyrnodytes subater (Oldroyd, 1957)
 Sisyrnodytes vestitus (Oldroyd, 1974)

Genus Smeryngolaphria
 Smeryngolaphria bicolorala (Tomasovic, 2003)
 Smeryngolaphria bromleyi (Londt, 1989)
 Smeryngolaphria gorayebi (Artigas & Papavero & Pimentel, 1988)
 Smeryngolaphria gurupi (Artigas & Papavero & Pimentel, 1988)
 Smeryngolaphria malanura (Wiedemann., 1828)
 Smeryngolaphria pallida (Bromley, 1935)
 Smeryngolaphria seabrai (Carrera, 1960)
 Smeryngolaphria taperignae (Artigas & Papavero & Pimentel, 1988)

Genus Sphagomyia
 Sphagomyia botswana (Londt, 2002)
 Sphagomyia kenya (Londt, 2002)

Genus Stackelberginia
 Stackelberginia gracilis (Lehr, 1964)
 Stackelberginia tsharykulievi (Lehr, 1964)

Genus Stenasilus
 Stenasilus brasiliensis (Schiner, 1867)
 Stenasilus impendens (Wiedemann, 1828)
 Stenasilus varipes (Schiner, 1867)

Genus Stenommatius
 Stenommatius formosanus (Matsumura, 1916)

Genus Stenopogon
 Stenopogon abdulrassuli (Lehr, 1984)
 Stenopogon adelantae (Wilcox, 1971)
 Stenopogon albalulus (Martin, 1968)
 Stenopogon albibasis (Bigot, 1878)
 Stenopogon albociliatus (Engel, 1929)
 Stenopogon ambryon (Walker, 1849)
 Stenopogon antoniae (Wilcox, 1971)
 Stenopogon aphrices (Walker, 1849)
 Stenopogon arnaudi (Martin, 1968)
 Stenopogon avus (Loew, 1874)
 Stenopogon bakeri (Wilcox, 1971)
 Stenopogon bartonae (Wilcox, 1971)
 Stenopogon blaisdelli (Wilcox, 1971)
 Stenopogon boharti (Bromley, 1951)
 Stenopogon breviusculoides (Bromley, 1937)
 Stenopogon breviusculus (Loew, 1872)
 Stenopogon bromleyi (Wilcox, 1971)
 Stenopogon brookmani (Wilcox, 1971)
 Stenopogon californioides (Bromley, 1937)
 Stenopogon callosus (Pallas, 1818)
 Stenopogon cazieri (Brookman, 1941)
 Stenopogon cervinus (Loew, 1861)
 Stenopogon cinchonaensis (Joseph & Parui, 1997)
 Stenopogon cinereus (Engel, 1940)
 Stenopogon colimae (Martin, 1968)
 Stenopogon coracinus (Loew, 1847)
 Stenopogon costatus (Loew, 1871)
 Stenopogon cressius (Tomasovic, 2005)
 Stenopogon damias (Walker, 1849)
 Stenopogon diablae (Wilcox, 1971)
 Stenopogon dorothyae (Martin, 1968)
 Stenopogon echelus (Walker, 1849)
 Stenopogon elizabethae (Martin, 1968)
 Stenopogon elongatissimus (Efflatoun, 1937)
 Stenopogon engelhardti (Bromley, 1937)
 Stenopogon englandi (Wilcox, 1971)
 Stenopogon felis (Bromley, 1931)
 Stenopogon festae (Bezzi, 1925)
 Stenopogon figueroae (Wilcox, 1971)
 Stenopogon flavotibialis (Martin, 1968)
 Stenopogon fulvus (Meigen, 1838)
 Stenopogon galbinus (Martin, 1968)
 Stenopogon hamus (Martin, 1968)
 Stenopogon heteroneurus (Macquart, 1838)
 Stenopogon hiemalis (Martin, 1968)
 Stenopogon hradskyi (Lehr, 1963)
 Stenopogon imbrex (Walker, 1849)
 Stenopogon inermipes (Strobl, 1909)
 Stenopogon inyae (Wilcox, 1971)
 Stenopogon iphippus (Séguy, 1932)
 Stenopogon iphis (Séguy, 1932)
 Stenopogon ischyrus (Séguy, 1932)
 Stenopogon jubatoides (Bromley, 1937)
 Stenopogon jurupae (Wilcox, 1971)
 Stenopogon kaltenbachi (Engel, 1929)
 Stenopogon kherai (Joseph & Parui, 1997)
 Stenopogon kirkwoodi (Wilcox, 1971)
 Stenopogon kocheri (Timon-David, 1951)
 Stenopogon kolenati (Gimmerthal, 1847)
 Stenopogon koreanus (Young, 2005)
 Stenopogon kozlovi (Lehr, 1963)
 Stenopogon lehri (Londt, 1999)
 Stenopogon linsleyi (Wilcox, 1971)
 Stenopogon loewi (Joseph & Parui, 1997)
 Stenopogon lomae (Wilcox, 1971)
 Stenopogon macswaini (Wilcox, 1971)
 Stenopogon manii (Joseph & Parui, 1997)
 Stenopogon manipurensisi (Joseph & Parui, 1997)
 Stenopogon marikovskii (Lehr, 1963)
 Stenopogon martini (Bromley, 1937)
 Stenopogon mediterraneus (Lehr, 1963)
 Stenopogon melanderi (Wilcox, 1971)
 Stenopogon milvus (Loew, 1847)
 Stenopogon mojavae (Wilcox, 1971)
 Stenopogon mollis (Loew, 1868)
 Stenopogon mysorensis (Joseph & Parui, 1997)
 Stenopogon nataliae (Richter, 1963)
 Stenopogon nathani (Joseph & Parui, 1997)
 Stenopogon neojubatus (Wilcox & Martin, 1945)
 Stenopogon nigritulus (Coquillett, 1904)
 Stenopogon nigriventris (Loew, 1868)
 Stenopogon nigrofasciatus (Brunetti, 1928)
 Stenopogon nigrolimbatus (Martin, 1968)
 Stenopogon obispae (Wilcox, 1971)
 Stenopogon obliteratus (Richter, 1963)
 Stenopogon occlusus (Theodor, 1980)
 Stenopogon ochraceus (Wulp, 1870)
 Stenopogon ochripes (Loew, 1861)
 Stenopogon oldroydi (Joseph & Parui, 1997)
 Stenopogon ortegai (Martin, 1968)
 Stenopogon ozenae (Wilcox, 1971)
 Stenopogon peregrinus (Séguy, 1932)
 Stenopogon piceus (von Roeder, 1883)
 Stenopogon pinyonae (Wilcox, 1971)
 Stenopogon porcus (Loew, 1871)
 Stenopogon povolnyi (Hradský, 1985)
 Stenopogon powelli (Wilcox, 1971)
 Stenopogon pradhani (Joseph & Parui, 1976)
 Stenopogon propinquus (Bromley, 1937)
 Stenopogon pseudosabaudus (Lehr, 1963)
 Stenopogon pulverifer (Walker, 1851)
 Stenopogon rafaelae (Wilcox, 1971)
 Stenopogon raven (Bromley, 1938)
 Stenopogon roederii (Bezzi, 1895)
 Stenopogon roonwali (Joseph & Parui, 1997)
 Stenopogon rossi (Martin, 1968)
 Stenopogon rufescens (Theodor, 1980)
 Stenopogon rufibarbis (Bromley, 1931)
 Stenopogon rufibarboides (Bromley, 1937)
 Stenopogon rufipilus (Loew, 1873)
 Stenopogon schisticolor (Gerstaecker, 1862)
 Stenopogon setosus (Bezark, 1984)
 Stenopogon silaceus (Martin, 1968)
 Stenopogon solsolacearum (Lehr, 1963)
 Stenopogon stackelbergi (Lehr, 1963)
 Stenopogon stonei (Bromley, 1937)
 Stenopogon subtus (Bromley, 1935)
 Stenopogon surrufus (Martin, 1968)
 Stenopogon taboarde (Strobl, 1909)
 Stenopogon tolandi (Wilcox, 1971)
 Stenopogon tristis (Meigen, 1820)
 Stenopogon truquii (Bellardi, 1861)
 Stenopogon utahensis (Bromley, 1951)
 Stenopogon variabilis (Lehr, 1963)
 Stenopogon werneri (Engel, 1933)
 Stenopogon wilcoxi (Bromley, 1937)
 Stenopogon williamsi (Wilcox, 1971)
 Stenopogon xochimilcae (Martin, 1968)
 Stenopogon zebra (Martin, 1968)
 Stenopogon zimini (Lehr, 1963)
 Stenopogon zinovievi (Lehr, 1963)

Genus Stichopogon
 Stichopogon abdominalis (Back, 1909)
 Stichopogon aequetinctus (Becker, 1910)
 Stichopogon albellus (Loew, 1856)
 Stichopogon albimystax (Joseph & Parui, 1997)
 Stichopogon ammophilus (Lehr, 1975)
 Stichopogon angustifrons (Theodor, 1980)
 Stichopogon araxicola (Richter, 1979)
 Stichopogon arenicola (Wilcox, 1936)
 Stichopogon argenteus (Say, 1823)
 Stichopogon auctus (Bezzi, 1912)
 Stichopogon aurigerum (Lehr, 1984)
 Stichopogon auritinctus (Abbassian-Lintzen, 1964)
 Stichopogon bancrofti (Hardy, 1934)
 Stichopogon barbiellinii (Bezzi, 1910)
 Stichopogon barbistrellus (Loew, 1854)
 Stichopogon basiti (Joseph & Parui, 1997)
 Stichopogon bedae (Hradský & Geller-Grimm, 1996)
 Stichopogon bengalensis (Joseph & Parui, 1997)
 Stichopogon biharilali (Joseph & Parui, 1997)
 Stichopogon callidus (Richter, 1966)
 Stichopogon canariensis (Becker, 1908)
 Stichopogon canus (Séguy, 1932)
 Stichopogon caucasicus (Bezzi, 1910)
 Stichopogon colei (Bromley, 1934)
 Stichopogon coquilletti (Bezzi, 1910)
 Stichopogon deserti (Theodor, 1980)
 Stichopogon dorsatus (Becker, 1915)
 Stichopogon dubiosus (Villeneuve, 1920)
 Stichopogon eluruensis (Joseph & Parui, 1997)
 Stichopogon fragilis (Back, 1909)
 Stichopogon gracilifemur (Nagatomi, 1983)
 Stichopogon gussakovskii (Lehr, 1975)
 Stichopogon gymnurus (Oldroyd, 1948)
 Stichopogon inaequalis (Loew, 1847)
 Stichopogon inconstans (Wiedemann, 1828)
 Stichopogon indicus (Joseph & Parui, 1997)
 Stichopogon infuscatus (Bezzi, 1910)
 Stichopogon irwini (Londt, 1979)
 Stichopogon kerteszi (Bezzi, 1910)
 Stichopogon kerzhneri (Lehr, 1975)
 Stichopogon mahatoi (Joseph & Parui, 1997)
 Stichopogon marinus (Efflatoun, 1937)
 Stichopogon maritima (Hardy, 1934)
 Stichopogon menoni (Joseph & Parui, 1997)
 Stichopogon meridionalis (Oldroyd, 1948)
 Stichopogon minor (Hardy, 1934)
 Stichopogon mitjaevi (Lehr, 1975)
 Stichopogon modestus (Lehr, 1975)
 Stichopogon molkovskii (Lehr, 1964)
 Stichopogon moremiensis (Londt, 1979)
 Stichopogon mukherjeei (Joseph & Parui, 1997)
 Stichopogon muticus (Bezzi, 1910)
 Stichopogon nartshukae (Lehr, 1975)
 Stichopogon nigritus (Paramonov, 1930)
 Stichopogon obscurus (Hardy, 1928)
 Stichopogon ocrealis (Rondani, 1863)
 Stichopogon oldroydi (Joseph & Parui, 1997)
 Stichopogon parvipulvillatus (Lehr, 1975)
 Stichopogon peregrinus (Osten-Sacken, 1882)
 Stichopogon pholipteron (Richter, 1973)
 Stichopogon pritchardi (Bromley, 1951)
 Stichopogon punctiferus (Bigot, 1878)
 Stichopogon ramakrishnai (Joseph & Parui, 1997)
 Stichopogon rivulorum (Lehr, 1975)
 Stichopogon rubzovi (Lehr, 1975)
 Stichopogon salinus (Melander, 1924)
 Stichopogon schnusei (Bezzi, 1910)
 Stichopogon selenginus (Lehr, 1984)
 Stichopogon septemcinctus (Becker, 1908)
 Stichopogon sogdianus (Lehr, 1975)
 Stichopogon stackelbergi (Lehr, 1975)
 Stichopogon surcoufi (Villeneuve, 1920)
 Stichopogon tomentosus (Oldroyd, 1948)
 Stichopogon tridactylophagus (Lehr, 1975)
 Stichopogon umkomaasensis (Oldroyd, 1974)
 Stichopogon unicolor (Ricardo, 1925)
 Stichopogon venustus (Richter, 1963)
 Stichopogon vernaculus (White, 1918)
 Stichopogon villiersi (Séguy, 1955)

Genus Stilpnogaster
 Stilpnogaster argonautica (Janssens, 1955)
 Stilpnogaster stabilis (Zeller, 1840)

Genus Stiphrolamyra
 Stiphrolamyra albibarbis (Engel, 1928)
 Stiphrolamyra annae (Londt, 1983)
 Stiphrolamyra apicalis (Curran, 1927)
 Stiphrolamyra bipunctata (Loew, 1858)
 Stiphrolamyra comans (Hobby, 1939)
 Stiphrolamyra diaxantha (Hermann, 1907)
 Stiphrolamyra hermanni (Londt, 1983)
 Stiphrolamyra rubicunda (Oldroyd, 1947)
 Stiphrolamyra schoemani (Londt, 1983)
 Stiphrolamyra sinaitica (Theodor, 1980)
 Stiphrolamyra vincenti (Londt, 1983)
 Stiphrolamyra vitai (Hradský & Geller-Grimm, 1997)

Genus Stizochymus
 Stizochymus salinator (Walker, 1849)

Genus Stizolestes
 Stizolestes atribarbis (Artigas, 1970)
 Stizolestes aureomaculatus (Bromley, 1932)
 Stizolestes mayi (Edwards, 1932)
 Stizolestes modellus (Bromley, 1932)
 Stizolestes nigriventris (Philippi, 1865)
 Stizolestes pamponeroides (Edwards, 1932)

Genus Storthyngomerus
 Storthyngomerus minor (Lindner, 1955)
 Storthyngomerus potanodrilus (Londt, 1998)
 Storthyngomerus toroensis (Oldroyd, 1970)

Genus Strombocodia
 Strombocodia elegans (Hermann, 1912)

Genus Strophipogon
 Strophipogon bromleyi (Hull, 1958)

Genus Synolcus
 Synolcus acrobaptus (Wiedemann, 1828)
 Synolcus amnoni (Londt, 1990)
 Synolcus argentius (Londt, 1990)
 Synolcus griseus (Engel, 1927)
 Synolcus incisuralis (Macquart, 1838)
 Synolcus malawi (Londt, 1990)
 Synolcus minor (Bromley, 1947)
 Synolcus spinosus (Londt, 1980)

Genus Systellogaster
 Systellogaster alba (Martin, 1975)
 Systellogaster breviventris (Rondani, 1848)
 Systellogaster fascipennis (Schiner, 1867)
 Systellogaster parva (Martin, 1975)

Genus Systropalpus
 Systropalpus aurivulpes (Hull, 1962)

References 

 
Asilidae